The Swanberg Dredge is one of several gold mining dredges that dot the landscape near Nome, Alaska. Also known as the Johnson-Pohl Dredge, this one is located at about mile marker 1 of the Nome-Council Highway just inside the city limits. The dredge was built in San Francisco, California, shipped to Nome, and placed in operation in 1946 by Walter Johnson. The economics associated with the cost of its construction and shipment, as compared to the price of gold, worked against Johnson, who only operated it for a single season before it was seized by a local bank. It has sat in place since then, typifying the sometimes hard-luck small-time mining operations of the area.

The dredge was listed on the National Register of Historic Places in 2001.

See also
National Register of Historic Places listings in Nome Census Area, Alaska

References

Buildings and structures completed in 1946
1946 establishments in Alaska
Buildings and structures in Nome Census Area, Alaska
Industrial buildings and structures on the National Register of Historic Places in Alaska
Industrial equipment on the National Register of Historic Places
Gold dredges
Gold mining in the United States
Buildings and structures on the National Register of Historic Places in Nome Census Area, Alaska